Kavitha is a 1973 Indian Malayalam-language film, directed by Vijaya Nirmala. The film stars Kaviyoor Ponnamma, Adoor Bhasi, Thikkurissy Sukumaran Nair and K. P. Ummer. The film had musical score by K. Raghavan.

Cast
Kaviyoor Ponnamma
Adoor Bhasi
Thikkurissy Sukumaran Nair
K. P. Ummer
Meena
Vijayanirmala
Vincent

Soundtrack
The music was composed by K. Raghavan and the lyrics were written by P. Bhaskaran and Poovachal Khader.

References

External links
 

1973 films
1970s Malayalam-language films
Films directed by Vijaya Nirmala